Gordon Murphy was an American Jesuit priest and missionary in India.

Gordon Murphy may also refer to:

Gord Murphy, ice hockey player
Gordon Murphy, character in Revenge (TV series)

Similar spelling
 Geordan Murphy, Irish rugby union player